Efraim Diveroli (born December 20, 1985) is an American former arms dealer and author. His company, AEY Inc., was a major weapons contractor for the U.S. Department of Defense. The U.S. government suspended AEY for violating its contract after AEY provided Chinese ammunition and attempted to hide the origins by repackaging it as being from Hungary, thus violating the American arms embargo against China. As a result of the publicity surrounding the contract and the age of the arms dealers – Diveroli was 21 and partner David Packouz was 25 when AEY landed the ammunition deal – the United States Army began a review of its contracting procedures.

Diveroli was sentenced to four years in federal prison. He is a central subject of the Todd Phillips' film War Dogs, released in 2016, as well as a memoir written in conjunction with convicted fraudster Matthew Cox and published in 2016.

Early life
Diveroli was born on December 20, 1985, in Miami Beach, Florida, the son of Ateret and Michael Diveroli. The family was Orthodox Jewish, strictly observing all traditional Jewish laws. He studied at Hebrew Academy in Miami Beach. His Iranian-born grandfather, Yoav Botach, was one of the wealthiest property owners in Los Angeles, and his uncle is celebrity rabbi Shmuley Boteach.

AEY Inc.

Formation of AEY
Diveroli returned home to Miami Beach Florida, in March 2001 at the age of fifteen. After an argument with his uncle, he told his father he wanted to open a business specializing in arms, ammunition trading, and defense contracts with the U.S. government. He convinced his father to sell him a shell company, AEY, Inc., named after the first initials of him and his siblings, which his father had incorporated as a small printing business, but had not done anything with for years. Diveroli showed a penchant for arms dealing and quickly made a name for himself within the industry. His young age and apparent talent led local media outlets to label him as an "arms wunderkind." Diveroli struggled with drug addiction and was also labeled as a "stoner arms dealer" by the media.

During the Cold War, the world engaged in a protracted and massive arms race. Millions of weapons were stockpiled throughout Eastern Europe, ready for a war with the West. When the Cold War ended, and the immediate threat of violence subsided, arms dealers started moving these vast amounts of weapons. The sales that followed formed the "gray market" where non-state actors (such as militia or terrorist groups) and legitimate government-sanctioned buyers could procure arms through illegal foreign government sales. "The Pentagon needed access to this new aftermarket to arm the militias it was creating in Iraq and Afghanistan. The trouble was, it couldn't go into such a murky underworld on its own. It needed proxies to do its dirty work — companies like AEY."

Contracts
Diveroli started working during this period of heavy arms trading as a teenager in a one-room apartment in Miami. Equipped with nothing more than a laptop, he sought to enter the industry from the seat of his couch. He began surfing solicitations on fbo.gov, or FedBizOpps, which is a government website where contracts are posted. He began by bidding on small contracts with the financial help of Ralph Merrill, with whom he did business during his time working for his uncle. By the age of eighteen, Diveroli had become a millionaire by continuing to beat out big corporations like Northrop Grumman, Lockheed and BAE Systems. In the words of Rolling Stone, Diveroli had "an appetite for risk and all-devouring ambition."

After steadily increasing the size of his contracts and developing a track record of success, Diveroli's company AEY, Inc. was awarded a $298 million contract by the Pentagon to provide arms and munitions to the allied forces in Afghanistan. To fulfill the US government contracts, Diveroli soon found himself dealing with dubious weapons traders, crooked diplomats, and soldiers of fortune; negotiating deals with foreign defense ministers, holding meetings at embassies, and taking calls from high-ranking Army officials.

On March 27, 2008, the U.S. government suspended AEY Inc. for infringing upon the terms of its contract; in violation of a pre-existing arms embargo, the company was accused of supplying ammunition manufactured in China to the Afghan National Army and police. United States Army documents showed that the company totaled more than $200 million in contracts to supply ammunition, rifles, and other weapons in 2007. As a result of publicity surrounding the contract, the United States Army began a review of its contracting procedures.

The United States House Committee on Oversight and Government Reform ruled the ammunition "unserviceable". AEY had also failed to perform on numerous previous contracts, including sending potentially unsafe helmets and failure to deliver 10,000 Beretta pistols to Iraq.

Diveroli's former partner, David Packouz, and Ralph Merrill, the group's former chief financier, later filed separate lawsuits against Diveroli seeking payment of millions of dollars they say they were owed in connection to the weapons contract with the U.S. government.

Trial and conviction 
A company Diveroli owns, Ammoworks, continued selling arms while he awaited trial for conspiracy. In late August 2008, he pleaded guilty on one count of conspiracy, and was sentenced to four years in prison on January 4, 2011. He was further sentenced for possessing a weapon while out on bond and had his overall sentence reduced for assisting in the investigation of the prosecution.
Diveroli's former partner David Packouz was sentenced to seven months' house arrest.

War Dogs

The story of Diveroli's arms deals is the subject of the Todd Phillips comedy/drama film War Dogs, starring Jonah Hill as Diveroli and Miles Teller as his partner, David Packouz, which was based on the reporting done by Canadian journalist Guy Lawson for Rolling Stone. In 2016, Diveroli filed a lawsuit against Warner Bros. Entertainment Inc., director Todd Phillips, producer Bradley Cooper, and others, seeking to block release of the film. Diveroli's suit against Warner Bros. claimed that the basis for the film was taken from his self-published memoir Once A Gun Runner, which convicted real estate fraudster Matthew Cox claims to have written while in prison with Diveroli.

References

Further reading

 
 

1985 births
Living people
People from Miami Beach, Florida
21st-century American criminals
Arms traders
American people convicted of fraud
Prisoners and detainees of the United States federal government
American prisoners and detainees
American Orthodox Jews